Dimorphothynnus bicolor is an insect in the Tiphiidae family.

It was first described by John Obadiah Westwood in 1844, as Enteles bicolor.

For a discussion of some of the problems associated with the taxonomy of this species, see B.B. Given's Notes on Australian Thynninae. II. The genera Dimorphothynnus, Rhagigaster and Eirone.

Description
Westwood describes it as follows:

Distribution 
Westwood states that it lives in King George's Sound.

References

Tiphiidae

Insects described in 1844